Ondansetron, sold under the brand name Zofran among others, is a medication used to prevent nausea and vomiting caused by cancer chemotherapy, radiation therapy, or surgery. It is also effective for treating gastroenteritis. It can be given by mouth or by injection into a muscle or into a vein.

Common side effects include diarrhea, constipation, headache, sleepiness, and itchiness. Serious side effects include QT prolongation and severe allergic reaction. It appears to be safe during pregnancy but has not been well studied in this group. It is a serotonin 5-HT3 receptor antagonist. It does not have any effect on dopamine receptors or muscarinic receptors.

Ondansetron was patented in 1984 and approved for medical use in 1990. It is on the World Health Organization's List of Essential Medicines. It is available as a generic medication. In 2020, it was the 83rd most commonly prescribed medication in the United States, with more than 8million prescriptions.

Medical uses
Although an effective antiemetic agent, the high cost of brand-name ondansetron initially limited its use to controlling postoperative nausea and vomiting and chemotherapy-induced nausea and vomiting.

Cancer treatment
The 5-HT3 receptor antagonists are the primary medications used to treat and prevent chemotherapy-induced nausea and vomiting and radiotherapy-induced nausea and vomiting.

Postoperative
A number of medications including ondansetron appear to be effective in controlling postoperative nausea and vomiting. It is more effective than metoclopramide, and less sedating than cyclizine or droperidol.

Pregnancy
Ondansetron is used off-label to treat morning sickness and hyperemesis gravidarum of pregnancy. It is typically used after other antinausea drugs have failed.

There appears to be a low risk of harm to the baby with use during pregnancy, though there may be an increase in heart problems among the babies.

Ondansetron is in pregnancy category B in the US. It is not known if ondansetron is excreted in breast milk.

Cyclic vomiting syndrome
Ondansetron is one of several antiemetic drugs used during the vomiting phase of cyclic vomiting syndrome.

Gastroenteritis
Trials in emergency department settings support the use of ondansetron to reduce vomiting associated with gastroenteritis and dehydration. A retrospective review found it was used commonly for this purpose, being administered in over 58% of cases. Its use reduced hospital admissions, but was also associated with higher rates of return visits to the emergency department. Furthermore, people who had initially received ondansetron were more likely to be admitted on the return visit than people who had not received the drug. However, this effect may simply be due to the agent being used more frequently in people who present with more severe illness. Its use was not found to mask serious diagnoses.

Irritable Bowel Syndrome (IBS) 
In one study of patients with IBS-D variant ondansetron showed statistically significant effect on stool consistency and bloating. Nonetheless, it did not have any antinociceptive activity.

Special populations

Children
Ondansetron has rarely been studied in people under 4 years of age. As such, little data is available to guide dosage recommendations.

Elderly
It is not necessary to adjust the dosage for people under 75 years of age. The use of ondansetron has not been studied in people older than 75 years of age, and it is not known if dosage should be adjusted for this group.

Poor liver function
The maximum recommended dose for people with severe liver function impairment is 8 mg/day. In these people, ondansetron is cleared from the body at half to one-third the rate as in healthy people. The concentration of ondansetron in body tissues as opposed to plasma is also higher than in healthy people.

Adverse effects
Headache is the most common adverse effect. A review of use for post-operative nausea and vomiting found that for every 36 people treated, one would experience headache, which could be severe.

Constipation, diarrhea, and dizziness are other commonly reported side effects. It is broken down by the hepatic cytochrome P450 system and it has little effect on the metabolism of other drugs broken down by this system.  Anecdotally, ototoxicity has also been reported if injected too quickly.

QT prolongation
Use of ondansetron has been associated with prolongation of the QT interval, which can lead to a potentially fatal heart rhythm known as torsades de pointes. Although this may happen in any person with any formulation, the risk is most salient with the injectable (intravenous) form of the drug and increases with dose. The risk is also higher in people taking other medicines that prolong the QT interval, as well as in people with congenital long QT syndrome, congestive heart failure, and/or bradyarrhythmias. As such, single doses of injectable ondansetron should not exceed 16 mg at one time. (Oral dosing recommendations remain intact, including the recommendation of a single 24-mg oral dose when indicated.) Electrolyte imbalances should be corrected before the use of injectable ondansetron. People are cautioned to seek immediate medical care if symptoms such as irregular heartbeat/palpitations, shortness of breath, dizziness, or fainting occur while taking ondansetron.

Overdose
No specific treatment is available for ondansetron overdose; people are managed with supportive measures. An antidote to ondansetron is not known.

Pharmacology

Pharmacodynamics
Ondansetron is a highly selective serotonin 5-HT3 receptor antagonist, with low affinity for dopamine receptors. The 5-HT3 receptors are present both peripherally on vagal nerve terminals and centrally in the chemoreceptor trigger zone of the area postrema in the medulla. Serotonin is released by the enterochromaffin cells of the small intestine in response to chemotherapeutic agents and may stimulate vagal afferents (via 5-HT3 receptors) to initiate the vomiting reflex. It is thought that ondansetron's antiemetic action is mediated mostly via antagonism of vagal afferents with a minor contribution from antagonism of central receptors.

Pharmacokinetics
Ondansetron may have a degree of peripheral selectivity due to binding to P-glycoprotein and efflux out of the brain at the blood–brain barrier.

History

Ondansetron (marketed under the brand name Zofran) was developed in the mid-1980s by GlaxoSmithKline in London. It was granted US patent protection in September 1987, received a use patent June 1988, and was approved by the US FDA in January 1991. It was granted another divisional patent in November 1996. Finally, owing to GlaxoSmithKline's research on pediatric use, ondansetron's patent protection was extended until December 2006. By this final year of its patent (2006), Zofran had become the 20th highest-selling brand-name drug in the United States, with sales of US$1.3 billion in the first 9 months of 2006 (80% from the US). The first generic versions were approved by the US FDA in December 2006, with marketing approval granted to Teva Pharmaceuticals USA and SICOR Pharmaceuticals. In 2018, University of São Paulo and Biolab were granted a patent for an orodispersible form of the drug.

Society and culture

Publication bias
In 1997, ondansetron was the subject of a meta-analysis case study published in the British Medical Journal. Researchers examined 84 trials, with 11,980 people receiving ondansetron, published between 1991 and September 1996. Intravenous ondansetron 4 mg versus placebo was investigated in 16 reports and three further reports which had been duplicated a total of six times. The number needed to treat (NNT) to prevent vomiting within 24 hours was 9.5, with 95% confidence interval 6.9 to 15, in the 16 nonduplicated reports. In the three duplicated reports, the NNT was significantly lower at 3.9 (3.3 to 4.8). When all 25 reports were combined, the apparent NNT improved to 4.9 (4.4 to 5.6). Inclusion of duplicate reports led to a 23% overestimation of ondansetron's antiemetic efficacy.

In addition, the authors found the covert duplication of reports on ondansetron was not easy to detect, because of lack of cross-referencing between papers, and reports containing duplicate findings were cited in eight reviews of the drug. Their analysis was a subject of an editorial in the Journal of the American Medical Association in 1999.

Availability
Ondansetron is a generic drug and is available in many countries under many brand names.

Routes of administration
It can be given by mouth, as a tablet or orally disintegrating tablet, or by injection into a muscle or into a vein.

Research

Psychiatric disorders
A 2006 double-blind, randomized controlled trial indicated ondansetron may have value in the treatment of schizophrenia, as an adjunct to haloperidol. The study found the combination to significantly improve negative schizophrenia symptoms, and people taking both drugs experienced fewer of the adverse effects commonly associated with haloperidol. An earlier, smaller, open-label trial had found ondansetron to be useful in treating antipsychotic-induced tardive dyskinesia in people with schizophrenia, and the study patients also showed significant improvement in the disease's symptoms.

Early studies have also examined ondansetron as a possible treatment for psychosis resulting from advanced Parkinson's disease. Its apparent benefits despite a lack of any significant antagonistic properties at dopamine receptors or the 5-HT2A receptor raises interesting questions about the etiology of psychosis.

Substance use
There is tentative evidence that it may be useful in decreasing the desired effects of alcohol. There is also some tentative evidence in those who are addicted to stimulants.

Postanesthetic shivering
Two small, placebo-controlled trials have been conducted to assess the efficacy of ondansetron for postanesthetic shivering, a common occurrence after surgery. Ondansetron was found to be as effective as pethidine (meperidine, Demerol) when given as a single intravenous dose before anesthesia.

References

External links
 

Antiemetics
5-HT3 antagonists
Imidazoles
Ketones
Peripherally selective drugs
World Health Organization essential medicines
Wikipedia medicine articles ready to translate